The RAI R-C-4 is a class of 4 axle Bo'Bo' electric locomotives used by the Islamic Republic of Iran Railways; the units have a similar design to the Swedish SJ Rc4.

See also 
 Iranian locomotives

References

Electric locomotives of Iran